Jean Pierre Conty, real name Jean Pierre Walrafen, (9 December 1917 - 12 September 1984) was a 20th-century French writer, famous for his spying novels.

The hero of most of his novel is Mr. Suzuki, a Japanese spy. He has also published under the pen name Jean Crau .

Works

Novels

Theatre 
In 1954, his play Affaire vous concernant is directed by Pierre Valde at the Théâtre de Paris. In 1965, he coauthored with Jean Bernard-Luc, a comédie-vaudeville which has now become a classic of the  genre : Quand épousez-vous ma femme ?, staged on theatre with Michel Serrault, Jean-Pierre Darras and Maria Pacôme.

Comic strips 
Several adaptations in comic strips of the series Mr. Suzuki have been made by Jacomo:

1974 : La nuit rouge de Mr. Suzuki, Artima
1975 : Mr. Suzuki a la dent dure, Artima
1975 : Mr. Suzuki et la ville fantôme, Artima
1977 : Mr. Suzuki lance un sos, Artima
1977 : Mr. Suzuki lance un sos (2), Artima

Cinema 
Robert Vernay has directed the cinematographic adaptation of Monsieur Suzuki prend la mouche in 1960 under the title:  with Jean Thielment, Ivan Desny, Pierre Dudan and Claude Farell.

Prizes and awards 
In 1953, he was awarded the Grand Prix de Littérature Policière for his novel ''Opération Odyssée .

References

External links 
 Liste de romans publiés, sur Polar-sf
 Éléments biographiques+ Liste des titres publiés, sur Fichesauteurs.canalblog.com

20th-century French novelists
French crime fiction writers
People from Moselle (department)
1917 births
1984 deaths